State Property is a 2002 American crime film starring Beanie Sigel, Memphis Bleek, Damon Dash and Jay-Z. It was produced by Jay-Z's Roc-A-Fella and distributed by Lionsgate. Abdul Malik Abbott directed the film and co-wrote its screenplay with Ernest "Tron" Anderson. The film was loosely based on Aaron Jones and the JBM in Philadelphia, Pennsylvania's drug trade from the late 1980s to early 1990s. It was followed by a sequel, State Property 2 which was released in 2005.

Synopsis
Frustrated with being broke, Beans (Sigel) decides that the only way to achieve the American Dream is to seize it. The film follows Beans and his crew, the ABM, as they take over the city of Philadelphia, creating mayhem as their empire builds.

Beans struggles to maintain his family life while bumping heads with opposing gangsters and police. It all comes to a head when he cannot surpass the city's most notorious crew, run by Untouchable J (Jay-Z) and Dame (Dash). The moves Beans and the ABM decide to make come with severe consequences.

Cast

Soundtrack

The State Property soundtrack was entirely performed by the State Property rap group. It was released on January 29, 2002 and peaked at 14 on Billboard 200 and 1 on the Top R&B/Hip-Hop Albums.

Reception
On Rotten Tomatoes, the film has an approval rating of 0% based on 12 reviews. The film also had a 9% rating from Metacritic.

TV Guide (Rating 2/4)- Formulaic but performed with some verve.

Sequel 
A sequel to the film, titled State Property 2, was released on April 13, 2005.

See also 
 List of hood films

References

External links 
 
 

2002 films
2000s crime films
American independent films
2000s hip hop films
Hood films
Films set in Philadelphia
Films shot in New Jersey
Lionsgate films
2002 directorial debut films
2000s English-language films
2000s American films